NER electric locomotives may refer to:

 British Rail Class EB1
 British Rail Class EE1
 British Rail Class EF1
 British Rail Class ES1

See also
 NER electric units